Third Set is an album by American singer, pianist, and songwriter Oleta Adams, released on February 10, 2017.

Track listing

References

2017 albums
Oleta Adams albums